Lead Me, Lord may refer to:

Lead Me Lord, album by Neal Morse
Lead me, Lord, short anthem by Samuel Sebastian Wesley extract from Praise the Lord, O my soul
Lead Me Lord, song by Basil Valdez